Jilliane Hoffman is an American writer of legal thrillers.  She was born on Long Island and attended both undergraduate and law school at St. John's University in Queens, New York.

Career
Before starting to write, Hoffman experienced the true life of a lawyer while working as an assistant state's attorney prosecuting felonies in Miami, Florida from 1992 to 1996. From 1996 to 2001, she was a regional advisor for the Florida Department of Law Enforcement consulting with special agents in complicated investigations including homicide, narcotics and organized crime.

With the knowledge obtained through years of work as a lawyer, Hoffman turned to writing legal/crime thrillers.  Her first novel, Retribution, was published in 2004, followed by Last Witness in 2005.  Her third book, Plea of Insanity, (originally scheduled for release in March 2007) was released in Europe in July 2008 and has been available in North America since April 2009.

Personal
She lives in South Florida with her husband and two children.

Works

C.J. Townsend books 

 Retribution (2004)
 Last Witness (2005)
 The Cutting Room (2012)
 Nemesis (2019)

Standalone novels 

 Plea of Insanity (2007)
 Pretty Little Things (2010)
 All the Little Pieces (2015)
 Insomnia (2017)

References

External links
 Official site

21st-century American novelists
American women novelists
Living people
St. John's University (New York City) alumni
Year of birth missing (living people)
21st-century American women writers